Bucculatrix armata is a moth in the family Bucculatricidae. It was described by Svetlana Seksjaeva in 1989. It is found in the Russian Far East (Primorsky Krai) and Japan (Hokkaido).

The forewings are white, mixed with orange brown.

The larvae feed on Tilia japonica. They mine the leaves of their host plant. The young larvae form a linear mine. Older larvae live freely, feeding on the upper surface of the leaf.

References

Natural History Museum Lepidoptera generic names catalog

Bucculatricidae
Moths described in 1989
Moths of Asia
Moths of Japan